Mickaël Miro (born in Lyon, France, on 8 November 1978 as Mickaël Cohen) is a French singer-songwriter. His name is a pseudonym, which he chose as a tribute to his grandfather, who was called Miro. He is best known for his debut single "L'Horloge Tourne", followed by his debut album Juste comme ça in 2011.

Early life and education 
Born in Lyon, Mickaël Miro studied business law in college and started writing many songs while studying.

Career 
He sticks to the tradition of French songs, influenced by what he calls French "BCBG" (meaning Balavoine, Cabrel, Berger, and Goldman).

In 2007, he took part in a musical collective "Les Marguerites" for fighting against Alzheimer appearing in the single "J'y étais pas" and later was signed to Midi52/EMI. In 2008, he toured with the rock group ANESA, opening for their shows.

In October 2010, he released his debut single "L'Horloge Tourne" with great success, followed by his debut album Juste comme ça, which contains collaborations with Natasha St Pier in duo. "Ma scandaleuse" became the second single release from the album. He also appeared in a number of television variety shows including Taratata and Tous Ensemble.

Awards
On 30 December 2011, his single "L'Horloge Tourne" won the award for "The Song of the Year 2011" in year-end program broadcast on TF1, called "La Chanson de l'année", presented by Nikos Aliagas.
On 28 January 2012, he was nominated in the category "Francophone Revelation of the Year" at the NRJ Music Awards 2012.

Discography

Albums

Singles

References

External links
Official website
Myspace

French songwriters
Male songwriters
1978 births
Living people
Musicians from Lyon
21st-century French singers
21st-century French male singers